Amblyscirtes tolteca, the toltec roadside skipper, is a species of grass skipper in the butterfly family Hesperiidae. It is found in Central America and North America.

Subspecies
These two subspecies belong to the species Amblyscirtes tolteca:
 Amblyscirtes tolteca prenda Evans, 1955
 Amblyscirtes tolteca tolteca Scudder, 1872

References

Further reading

 

Hesperiinae
Articles created by Qbugbot
Butterflies described in 1872